Engle is an unincorporated community in Jefferson County, West Virginia, United States, originally known by the names of Millers Mill, Striders Crossing, Keller, and Engles Switch before its post office's name changed to Engle in 1910.

The community was named after Frank Engle, the proprietor of a lime kiln.

References

Unincorporated communities in Jefferson County, West Virginia
Unincorporated communities in West Virginia